Joseph "Do It All" Geroy Hall (born March 6, 1966) is an American former professional baseball outfielder. He played three seasons of Major League Baseball with the Chicago White Sox and Detroit Tigers.

Amateur career
A native of Paducah, Kentucky, Hall attended St. Mary High School and Southern Illinois University. In 1987, he played collegiate summer baseball in the Cape Cod Baseball League for the Yarmouth-Dennis Red Sox and was named a league all-star. He was drafted by the St. Louis Cardinals in the 10th round of the 1988 amateur draft.

Professional career
Hall played his first professional season with their Class A (Short Season) Hamilton Redbirds and Class A Springfield Cardinals in 1988, and his last season with Detroit and their Triple-A Toledo Mud Hens in 1997.

The journeyman made his major league debut in 1994, 6 years after being drafted. He had a batting average of .393 going into mid-May, when he badly injured his right hamstring. This landed him on the disabled list, and ended his promising start to the season. After the injury, the Sun-Times interviewed him. "The only thing I can think of is not playing every day," Hall said. "It's frustrating any time you get hurt, but especially when you wait so long (to make it to the majors)." On June 30, 1994, Hall suffered another setback in his rehab and was put on the emergency 60 day disabled list. He was never able to replicate the success from his first two months as a rookie.

References

External links

Retrosheet
Venezuelan Professional Baseball League statistics

1966 births
Living people
African-American baseball managers
African-American baseball players
American expatriate baseball players in Canada
American expatriate baseball players in Mexico
Arkansas Travelers players
Baseball players from Kentucky
Birmingham Barons players
Caribes de Oriente players
Chicago White Sox players
Detroit Tigers players
Hamilton Redbirds players
Major League Baseball left fielders
Major League Baseball right fielders
Minor league baseball managers
Nashville Sounds players
Oklahoma RedHawks players
Petroleros de Cabimas players
Rochester Red Wings players
Rojos del Águila de Veracruz players
South Bend Silver Hawks players
Southern Illinois Salukis baseball players
Springfield Cardinals players
St. Mary High School (Paducah, Kentucky) alumni
St. Petersburg Cardinals players
Sportspeople from Paducah, Kentucky
Toledo Mud Hens players
Vancouver Canadians players
Waterbury Spirit players
Yarmouth–Dennis Red Sox players
American expatriate baseball players in Venezuela
21st-century African-American people
20th-century African-American sportspeople
American expatriate baseball players in Taiwan
Uni-President Lions players